The 2000 NCAA Division II Men's Soccer Championship was the 29th annual tournament held by the NCAA to determine the top men's Division II college soccer program in the United States.

Cal State Dominguez Hills (23-1-1) defeated hosts Barry, 2–1, in the tournament final, after four overtime periods.

This was the first national title for the Toros, who were coached by Joe Flanagan.

Bracket

Final

See also  
 NCAA Division I Men's Soccer Championship
 NCAA Division III Men's Soccer Championship
 NAIA Men's Soccer Championship

References 

NCAA Division II Men's Soccer Championship
NCAA Division II Men's Soccer Championship
NCAA Division II Men's Soccer Championship
NCAA Division II Men's Soccer Championship
Cal State Dominguez Hills Toros